The Codex Sangallensis 381 (Signature Cod. Sang. 381) is an early medieval music manuscript, produced in the abbey of St. Gallen and stored in the Abbey Library in St. Gallen. The manuscript is known for its exhaustive collection of so-called tropes, verses, and sequences. Together with the Cod. Sang. 484, this manuscript makes an important contribution to one of the most exhaustive collections of such compositions in the East Frankish kingdom and thus plays an important role in the history of music.

Description 
With a surface area of just 14.5cm x 11.5cm, the manuscript is of a smaller format than most of its contemporaries. Its contents are stretched to 500 pages, for which parchment was used as a writing material. Mainly the edges of either goat, sheep or rarely calf skins were used. The manuscript was rebound in the 15th century and was restored in 1992. The binding consists of two beech plates with dark-brown leather over the spine. The composition of the manuscript is attributed to one main scribe and collector of the 10th century, to whom the authorship of the codex is assigned, even though additional scribes added further material and corrections until the 13th century.

History 

The origins of the manuscript can be viewed as a part of a bigger process of trope writing as well as the extension of originally Roman liturgy, which was not only shaped by the three influential figures Tuotilo, Notker and Ratpert at the abbey in St. Gallen, but also occurred in the larger context of the entire Frankish empire.

The initial composition of the manuscript by the main scribe is dated in the second quarter of the 10th century. Analyses of the scribe’s hand in the manuscript suggest that the main scribe was in fact a monk named Salomon, who was affiliated with the abbey of St. Gallen and who earlier on compiled the Cod. Sang. 484, an earlier tropary, as well. This assumption is based on a charter dated at 926-928 which was signed with the name “Salomon” and whose writing can be identified as that featured in the codex. In the literature, some doubts remain regarding the actual name of the scribe, which is why most publications use the neutral term Σ (sigma). Both manuscripts can thus be interpreted as a part of a larger process of trope collection that took place in the abbey at the same time. 

The fact that the Cod. Sang. 484 is represented as a part of the Cod. Sang. 381 in its entirety suggests an underlying copying process that is involved in the production of codices at the abbey. It is assumed that the scribe of the much less corrected Cod. Sang. 381 oriented himself by his earlier creation and used the Cod. Sang. 484, characterised by frequent erasures and rearrangements or insertions of material, as a template for his second creation.

The size as well as the simple realisation of the codex suggests that it was meant for the hand of a monastic cantor, whose role during the mass came close to that of a lead singer. Contained in the manuscript are chants that were created for specific occasions and were thus only sung once. Some chants, however, continued to be in use in the liturgical practice until the 13th century. Furthermore, the entire inventory of Notker’s Liber Ymnorum, a book dedicated to the bishop Liutward of Vercelli and consisting of roughly 40 sequences, is also present in the manuscript.

Structure 

The manuscript begins with a sequence, a litany (later additions) and lauds. The pages 6-9 contain a copy of the “Epistola Notkeri ad Lantbertum” – a letter of Notker to Lantbert – in which the meaning of the so-called significative letters is explained. More specifically, these significative letters were textual additions to the normal neumic notation in the form of letters, which contained additional information regarding the course of the melody, rhythm and pitch.

Pages 10-12 contain a fragment titled “De sono singularum litterarum martiani” (On the sound of singular letters of Martianus) taken from “De nuptiis Philologiae et Mercurii” by Martianus Capella. It describes techniques of articulation for the correct pronunciation of the letters of the Latin (and partially the Greek and German) alphabet. The remaining manuscript contains a collection of versus (metric processional hymns, tropes, and sequences in the following order:

Contents

Reception 
Particularly during the golden age of the abbey – during the time of Notker, Ratpert and Tuotilo – St. Gallen was known for the ingenuity as well as the quality of the produced chants. Consequently, individual tropes were received quite broadly within Europe: Tuotilo's trope “Hodie cantandus est” for the Introitus “Puer natus est”, for instance, can be found in over 100 European manuscripts, mostly concentrated in copies in German-speaking areas. Simultaneously, a not insignificant number of copies from southern France, the Alsace as well as northern Italy have been recorded. Further tropes also appear in manuscripts in the same areas, but not to the same extent.

Literature 
 Abbey Library St. Gallen, Cod. Sang. 381, Codex Sangallensis 381.
 Arlt, Wulf/Ranking, Susan: Codices 484 & 381. Band 1: Kommentar/Commentary, Winterthur 1996.
 Arlt, Wulf/Ranking, Susan: Codices 484 & 381. Band 3: Codex Sangallensis 381, Winterthur 1996.
 Hild, Elaine Stratton: Verse, Music, and Notation: Observations on Settings of Poetry in Sankt Gallen’s Ninth- and Tenth-Century Manuscripts, doctoral thesis, University of Colorado, Ann Arbor 2014.
 Hospenthal, Cristina: Tropen zum Ordinarium Missae in St. Gallen. Untersuchungen zu den Beständen in den Handschriften St. Gallen, Stiftsbibliothek 381, 484, 376, 378, 380 und 382, Bern 2010 (Publikationen der Schweizerischen Musikforschenden Gesellschaft 52).
 Rankin, Susan: Notker und Tuotilo: Schöpferische Gestalten in einer Neuen Zeit, in: Schweizer Jahrbuch für Musikwissenschaft 11, 1991, S. 17-42.
 Scherrer, Gustav: Verzeichniss der Handschriften der Stiftsbibliothek von St. Gallen, Halle 1875. Online: <http://www.e-codices.unifr.ch/de/description/csg/0381/>, Accessed: 02.04.2022.

References

External links 
 Collection of Swiss manuscripts
 https://www.e-codices.unifr.ch/de/list/one/csg/0381 - Digital facsimile of the Cod. Sang. 381 including a standard description
 https://www.stiftsbezirk.ch/de/stiftsbibliothek/recherche/ - Research portal of the Abbey Library of St. Gallen

Manuscripts of the Abbey library of Saint Gall
Palimpsests
9th-century biblical manuscripts
Vulgate manuscripts
Early medieval Latin literature
Medieval music manuscript sources
Medieval manuscripts